The 2012–13 Ukrainian Premier League Reserves and Under 19 season are competitions between the reserves of Ukrainian Premier League Clubs and the Under 19s. The events in the senior leagues during the 2011–12 season saw Obolon Kyiv Reserves and Oleksandria Reserves all relegated and replaced by the promoted teams Hoverla Uzhhorod Reserves and Metalurh Zaporizhya Reserves.

In 2012 the Premier League expanded the league to include an Under 19 competition.
The Under 19 competition is divided into two geographical groups and in the first stage of the competition play a round robin phase.

Managers

Reserves competition

Final standings

Top scorers

Under 19 competition

First stage

Group A

Group B

Second stage

Group 1

Group 2

See also
2012–13 Ukrainian Premier League

References

Reserves
Ukrainian Premier Reserve League seasons